Brody  is a village in the administrative district of Gmina Sulechów, within Zielona Góra County, Lubusz Voivodeship, in western Poland.

The village has a population of 750.

The Brody Ferry, a cable ferry, crosses the River Oder at Brody.

References

Villages in Zielona Góra County